Lauren Thomas-Johnson (born 25 May 1988) is a British female professional basketball player.

External links
Profile at eurobasket.com

1988 births
Living people
People from Stockport
British women's basketball players
Small forwards